Mauricio Pimiento Barrera (born March 17, 1961) is a Colombian politician, former Senator of Colombia. Pimiento was arrested on February 16, 2007, after being involved in the Para-political scandal. On May 16, 2008, Colombian justice condemned Pimiento to 7 years in prison for conspirating with a terrorist group and electoral fraud.

Early life
Pimiento studied law and graduated from the  Free University of Colombia and has a master in Law from the American University in the United States.

Career
Pimiento has been Secretary General and Sub-Director of the National Institute of Social Security and General Director of the Co-Financing Fund for the Rural Sector.

With the political support of the Araujo family in Valledupar he became Governor of the Cesar Department between 1995 and 1997. he was later elected as Senator of Colombia, participating in the first senate committee.

Pimiento was arrested February 16, 2007 after being involved in the Para-political scandal.

References

External links
Caracol.com.co - Capturados otros cinco congresistas por el escándalo de la "para política"
elcolombiano.com Rostros - Mauricio Pimiento
ELTIEMPO.com - Presos cinco congresistas más por el caso de la parapolítica

1961 births
20th-century Colombian lawyers
Free University of Colombia alumni
Colombian prisoners and detainees
Governors of Cesar Department
Living people
Members of the Senate of Colombia
Social Party of National Unity politicians
Colombian parapolitics scandal
Colombian politicians convicted of crimes